Oorlog en vrede is a 1918 Dutch silent war drama film directed by Maurits Binger. It is named after the novel War and Peace by Leo Tolstoy, but is not an adaptation of it. It follows three families during World War I. Only a single fragment of the film survives.

Cast
 Annie Bos - Any Godard
 Adelqui Migliar - Jean Laurent / Mario Laurent
 Paula de Waart - Pauline Laurent
 Lola Cornero - Ninette Laurent
 Caroline van Dommelen - Nora de Roqueville
 Jan van Dommelen - Robert de Roqueville
 Willem van der Veer - Gaston de Roqueville
 Minny Erfmann - Stella Marie
 Eberhard Erfmann - Frits
 Jan Buderman - Vader Godard
 Catharina Kinsbergen-Rentmeester - Moeder Godard
 Cor Smits - Hofman
 Heléne Wehman - Rosa Hofman
 Mimi Boesnach
 Jeanne Van der Pers

References

External links 
 

1918 films
1910s war drama films
Dutch black-and-white films
Dutch silent feature films
Films directed by Maurits Binger
Dutch war drama films
World War I films
Lost Dutch films
1918 drama films
Silent war drama films